Parliamentary elections were held in North Korea on 9 March 2014 to elect the members of the 13th Supreme People's Assembly.

Background
This was the first election since the assumption of Kim Jong-un as leader of the country as the leader of the Workers' Party of Korea, following the death of his father Kim Jong-il and the execution of Jang Song-thaek.

Outside observers claimed the elections were an effective way to poll the population on their opinion on the government. In addition, it functioned as a way for the government to determine whether any of its citizens had illegally changed their voting district within the country, or if people had left the country. The North Korean Government did so by enforcing borders and surveillance, in order to make sure that the voter turnout is reflective of the population. If there were missing people, then the local workers and residents would be found responsible, so local workers tried to ensure order in their region.

On 4 February, KCNA reported that a meeting of electorates in Paektusan Constituency 111 nominated WPK first secretary Kim Jong-un as deputy to the Supreme People's Assembly. According to a report in the Rodong Sinmun, the meeting to select him took place in the presence of senior military heavyweights, such as KPA General Political Department Director Choe Ryong-hae, Chief of the General Staff of the Korean People's Army Ri Yong-gil, and Minister of the People's Armed Forces Jang Jong-nam.

Voting practices and procedures
The purpose of elections in North Korea that year was to determine the location of voters and, in theory, their political allegiance, as well as to fill parliament seats with new members who are loyal to Kim Jong-un. Members of the Supreme People's Assembly were elected in single-member constituencies, with one approved candidate put forward in each constituency. Large groups of voters were presented with a ballot while moving through a voting booth, on which there was a single box to tick a candidate's name. Voters had to stop to cross out the candidate, making the process a monitored event. Voting is also compulsory in North Korea. Some North Koreans in China who defected to South Korea after the famine in their home country in the mid-1990s had said that they did so because they feared punishment back home for failing to show up for parliamentary elections.

Results
The main parties taking part were the Workers' Party of Korea, the Korean Social Democratic Party, the Chondoist Chongu Party as well as independent candidates. All candidates were also members of the Democratic Front for the Reunification of the Fatherland. While there are officially four parties in North Korean politics, each candidate must be approved by the Democratic Front for the Reunification of the Fatherland, the dominant party in North Korean politics.

Elected members
The following were elected as members of parliament:

 Electoral District (Mangyongdae): Pak Jong-nam
 Electoral District (Kwangbok): Choe Phyong-il
 Electoral District (Phalkol): Yun Yong-chol
 Electoral District (Changhun): Kim Yun-sil
 Electoral District (Kalrimkil): O Ryong-thaek
 Electoral District (Chukjon): Ri Ul-sol
 Electoral District (Taephyong): Kim Yong-bok
 Electoral District (Wonro): Kim Tong-suk
 Electoral District (Kyongsang): Kim Kwang-chol
 Electoral District (Kyoku): Hong So-hon
 Electoral District (Ryonhwa): Sim Kyong-ok
 Electoral District (Sochang): Kil Kum-sun
 Electoral District (Phyongchon): Ri Yon-hui
 Electoral District (Ansan): Ri Yong-sik
 Electoral District (Ponghak): Pak Hyang-sim
 Electoral District (Ryukkyo): Mun Sok-bul
 Electoral District (Saemaul): Cho Kil-nyo
 Electoral District (Pothongkang): Pang Sung-son
 Electoral District (Ryukyong): Kim Ung-chol
 Electoral District (Pulkunkori): Ri Mi-ok
 Electoral District (Kaeson): Yang Hyong-sob
 Electoral District (Pipha): Cho Yon-jun
 Electoral District (Chonsung): O Kuk-ryol
 Electoral District (Kinmaul): Pyon Yong-sam
 Electoral District (Sosong): Kim Hae-song
 Electoral District (Changkyong): Kim Tong-hyok
 Electoral District (Hasin): Kim Kyong-su
 Electoral District (Chungsin): Pak Pong-nam
 Electoral District (Taesong): Thae Hyong-chol
 Electoral District (Ryonghung): Kim Yong-ju
 Electoral District (Anhak): Chong Myong-il
 Electoral District (Tongmun): Kim Song-hui
 Electoral District (Chongryu): Kim Myong-sik
 Electoral District (Munsu): Ri Myong-chol
 Electoral District (Thabje): Ri Yong-mu
 Electoral District (Sakok): Ryang Pong-jin
 Electoral District (Tongdaewon): Choe Yong-rim
 Electoral District (Ryuldong): Kim Sok-nam
 Electoral District (Sinri): Kim In-chol
 Electoral District (Samma): Yun Sok-chon
 Electoral District (Sonkyo): Ri Kyong-il
 Electoral District (Tungme): Kim Yong-il
 Electoral District (Ryulkok): Hwang Kil-chol
 Electoral District (Yongje): Mun Kang-sun
 Electoral District (Rakrang): Choe Song-il
 Electoral District (Chongo): Chang Jae-on
 Electoral District (Chongbaek): Choe Myong-hak
 Electoral District (Chungsong): Ri Kun-il
 Electoral District (Kwanmun): Kim Kyok-sik
 Electoral District (Sungri): Kim Yang-kon
 Electoral District (Wonam): Pak Hyong-ryol
 Electoral District (Ryongsong): Ri Song-hui
 Electoral District (Rimwon): Cha Hui-rim
 Electoral District (Ryongkung): Chu Kyu-chang
 Electoral District (Unha): Kim Yong-nam
 Electoral District (Oun): Choe Chun-sik
 Electoral District (Masan): Choe Song-won
 Electoral District (Kwahak): Chang Chol
 Electoral District (Paesan): Pak Thae-song
 Electoral District (Sadong): Cho Hyong-chol
 Electoral District (Turu): Pak Yong-ae
 Electoral District (Hyuam): Choe Thae-bok
 Electoral District (Rihyon): Chong Yong-suk
 Electoral District (Ryokpho): Hong Son-ok
 Electoral District (Nungkum): Ri Chang-sik
 Electoral District (Hyongjesan): Choe Chol-jung
 Electoral District (Hadang): Ro Ik-hwa
 Electoral District (Hyongsan): Kim Jong-suk
 Electoral District (Sinmi): Kim Pong-chol
 Electoral District (Sunan): Kang Ki-sob
 Electoral District (Sokbak): Chong Myong-chol
 Electoral District (Samsok): Kim Phyong-hae
 Electoral District (Todok): Kim Yong-chun
 Electoral District (Kangnam): Han Ho-nam
 Electoral District (Yongjin): Ri Hyon-chol
 Electoral District (Kangdong): Cho Chun-ryong
 Electoral District (Ponghwa): Kim Yong-dae
 Electoral District (Samdung): Kim Yong-ho
 Electoral District (Hari): Chong Myong-su
 Electoral District (Hukryong): Kim Phyo-hun
 Electoral District (Munhwa): Ri Man-song
 Electoral District (Phyongsong): Chae Myong-hak
 Electoral District (Undok): An Myong-ok
 Electoral District (Ori): Kang Sok-ju
 Electoral District (Samhwa): Ro Tu-chol
 Electoral District (Kuwol): Yun Yong-nam
 Electoral District (Okjon): Pak Kil-nam
 Electoral District (Paeksong): Kim Jong-im
 Electoral District (Anju): Chae Ho-nam
 Electoral District (Sinanju): Pak Sun-nyo
 Electoral District (Tongmyon): Han Kwang-sang
 Electoral District (Wonphung): Kang Yong-su
 Electoral District (Namphyong): Kim Myong-chol
 Electoral District (Namhung): Ri Mu-yong
 Electoral District (Kaechon): Kim Kum-suk
 Electoral District (Ramjon): Mun Myong-hak
 Electoral District (Sambong): Ri Yong-chol
 Electoral District (Konji): Paek Song-nam
 Electoral District (Kangchol): Chang Pyong-kyu
 Electoral District (Ryongjin): Kim Sun-hwa
 Electoral District (Kagam): Han Song-ho
 Electoral District (Alil): Rim Tong-chol
 Electoral District (Ryongun): Ri Yong-su
 Electoral District (Sunchon): O Yong-kon
 Electoral District (Thaebaeksan): Kim Kwang-hyok
 Electoral District (Odaesan): Ri Pyong-chol
 Electoral District (Unphasan): Cha Jun-sik
 Electoral District (Chilbongsan): Sim Jae-ul
 Electoral District (Myoraksan): Choe Yong-ho
 Electoral District (Changamsan): Ho Ryong
 Electoral District (Paektusan): Kim Jong-un
 Electoral District (Pongsusan): Ri Song-sun
 Electoral District (Sobaeksan): Kim Jong-kwan
 Electoral District (Namchongang): Hwang Kun-il
 Electoral District (Changjagang): Kim Myong-sik
 Electoral District (Sinphagang): Chin Chol-su
 Electoral District (Taesongsan): Pyon In-son
 Electoral District (Mannyonsan): Chon Il
 Electoral District (Kuwolsan): Kim Jin-chol
 Electoral District (Hannasan): No Kwang-chol
 Electoral District (Chonmasan): Chon Yong-hak
 Electoral District (Samkaksan): Ri Kyong-chon
 Electoral District (Sungrisan): Cho Kyong-chol
 Electoral District (Osongsan): Ri Yong-rae
 Electoral District (Rokdusan): So Hong-chan
 Electoral District (Unbaeksan): Choe Tong-yun
 Electoral District (Pongsungsan): Kim Kwang-chol
 Electoral District (Paekmasan): Ri Jong-kuk
 Electoral District (Songaksan): Kim Kum-chol
 Electoral District (Suyangsan): An Kuk-chol
 Electoral District (Sindoksan): Choe Song-un
 Electoral District (Myongdangsan): Han Chang-sun
 Electoral District (Pongaksan): Pak Yong-bok
 Electoral District (Taemyongsan): Kim Myong-nam
 Electoral District (Ryongaksan): Kim Sok-hong
 Electoral District (Songchonkang): An Ji-yong
 Electoral District (Phyongchonkang): Park Su-il
 Electoral District (Sujongkang): Chin Yong-chol
 Electoral District (Chailkang): Kim Song-il
 Electoral District (Samchonkang): Pak Jong-chon
 Electoral District (Somjinkang): Song Sok-won
 Electoral District (Yongchonkang): Kim Chun-sam
 Electoral District (Okchonkang): Choe Ryong-hae
 Electoral District (Ryesankang): Pak Sung-won
 Electoral District (Oekumkang): Kim Su-gil
 Electoral District (Kalmakang): Chon Jae-kwon
 Electoral District (Haekumkang): Kim Chol
 Electoral District (Piphakang): Kim Kwang-hyon
 Electoral District (Kumchonkang): Ri Yong-kil
 Electoral District (Taedongkang): Chang Jong-nam
 Electoral District (Chachonkang): Ri Chol
 Electoral District (Aprokkang): Pang Chang-dok
 Electoral District (Tumankang): Pak Tong-hak
 Electoral District (Kunmasan): An Ki-chol
 Electoral District (Naekumkang): Ri Kwan-su
 Electoral District (Kumsu): Yun Jong-rin
 Electoral District (Haebal): Kim Song-dok
 Electoral District (Moranbong): Ri Kuk-jun
 Electoral District (Haebang): Kim Won-hong
 Electoral District (Pyoldong): Choe Pu-il
 Electoral District (Hyoksin): Kang Phil-hun
 Electoral District (Hwaebul): Kim Myong-ju
 Electoral District (Chonjin): Hwang Min-chol
 Electoral District (Chasongkang): Ri Yong-hwan
 Electoral District (Ponghwasan): Sin Sung-hun
 Electoral District (Kumkangsan): Ro Kyong-jun
 Electoral District (Saedok): Kim Song-ui
 Electoral District (Soksu): Choe Yong-il
 Electoral District (Ryonpho): Choe Yong-kon
 Electoral District (Cheyak): Pak Pong-ju
 Electoral District (Subok): Choe Hwi
 Electoral District (Chikdong): Song Chang-ho
 Electoral District (Ryongak): Choe Ji-son
 Electoral District (Tokchon): Kim Chol-ung
 Electoral District (Kongwon): Ro Hung-se
 Electoral District (Chenam): Ri Yong-chol
 Electoral District (Chongsong): Hong In-bom
 Electoral District (Sangdok): Choe Kwang-jin
 Electoral District (Changsang): Hyon Ung-sil
 Electoral District (Taedong): Hong Kwang-suk
 Electoral District (Sijong): Kim Chang-sob
 Electoral District (Yonkok): Kim Hye-ran
 Electoral District (Chungsan): Ri Ryong-nam
 Electoral District (Kwangje): Sin O-sun
 Electoral District (Phungjong): Han Chol
 Electoral District (Phyongwon): Kim Jung-hyob
 Electoral District (Wonhwa): So Kyong-sim
 Electoral District (Opha): Ma Won-chun
 Electoral District (Unbong): Son Kyong-nam
 Electoral District (Hanchon): Sim Kuk-ryong
 Electoral District (Sukchon): Kim Kye-kwan
 Electoral District (Ryongdok): Kim Man-song
 Electoral District (Yoldusamchon): Kim Yong-kil
 Electoral District (Namyang): Yu Jong-sok
 Electoral District (Komsan): Chang Hyon-chol
 Electoral District (Mundok): Pak Myong-chol
 Electoral District (Ribsok): Rim Tok-hwa
 Electoral District (Ryongo): Chu Myong-son
 Electoral District (Songchon): Tong Jong-ho
 Electoral District (Kunja): Chu Su-yong
 Electoral District (Sinsongchon): Ho Jong-chon
 Electoral District (Changrim): Kim Ki-kun
 Electoral District (Sinyang): An Kum-chol
 Electoral District (Yangdok): Kang Chu-ryon
 Electoral District (Tongyang): Kim Ok-ryon
 Electoral District (Unsan): Kil Rye-su
 Electoral District (Chonsong): Kang Hyong-bong
 Electoral District (Kubong): Hyon Sang-ju
 Electoral District (Chaedong): Kim Kyong-ho
 Electoral District (Haksan): Sin Ung-sik
 Electoral District (Mangil): Kim Kwang-uk
 Electoral District (Pukchang): Kim Yong-chol
 Electoral District (Songnam): Mun Sun-hui
 Electoral District (Okchon): Kim Yon-hwa
 Electoral District (Inpho): U Won-yong
 Electoral District (Maengsan): Cho Won-thaek
 Electoral District (Nyongwon): Pak Tong-chol
 Electoral District (Taehung): Kim Sang-uk
 Electoral District (Hoechang): Son Sok-kun
 Electoral District (Sinjak): Kim Pae-jong
 Electoral District (Chongnam): Pak Yong-jin
 Electoral District (Komunkum): An Chol-sik
 Electoral District (Tukjang): Chon Hak-chol
 Electoral District (Unkok): Kim Tong-il
 Electoral District (Sinuiju): So Ran-hui
 Electoral District (Paeksa): Ri Hak-song
 Electoral District (Namjung): Kim Kyong-nam
 Electoral District (Minpho): Ri Kwang-kun
 Electoral District (Sumun): Chon Il-chun
 Electoral District (Chinson): O Jong-hui
 Electoral District (Ryusang): Chong Myong-hak
 Electoral District (Wai): Ri Pong-juk
 Electoral District (Sokha): Kim Hye-yong
 Electoral District (Rakchong): Pak Jong-kun
 Electoral District (Yonha): Yun Tu-kun
 Electoral District (Kusong): So Chun-yong
 Electoral District (Paeksok): Pak Chun-kon
 Electoral District (Panghyon): Yun Tong-hyon
 Electoral District (Namchang): Ri Jong-kuk
 Electoral District (Chahung): O Mun-hyon
 Electoral District (Chongju): Kim Ik-chol
 Electoral District (Tokon): Kim Hui-suk
 Electoral District (Koan): Kim Kyong-ae
 Electoral District (Namho): Ri Yong-jun
 Electoral District (Kalsan): Kwon Song-ho
 Electoral District (Sakju): Pak Song-sil
 Electoral District (Phungnyon): Ri Man-kon
 Electoral District (Suphung): Kang Won-sik
 Electoral District (Chongsong): Kim Pong-il
 Electoral District (Phihyon): Kim Jong-sun
 Electoral District (Ryangchaek): Han Song-hyok
 Electoral District (Paekma): Kim Yong-son
 Electoral District (Ryongchon): Ri Myong-chol
 Electoral District (Pukjung): Kim Yong-man
 Electoral District (Ryongampho): Kwak Chol-ho
 Electoral District (Sinam): Kim Yong-sun
 Electoral District (Yomju): Chu Yong-sik
 Electoral District (Tasa): Choe Yong-dok
 Electoral District (Oeha): Paek On
 Electoral District (Cholsan): So Tong-myong
 Electoral District (Kasan): Ri Chol
 Electoral District (Tongrim): Hong Kyong-jun
 Electoral District (Chongkang): Choe Sang-kon
 Electoral District (Sinkok): Ri Yong-chol
 Electoral District (Sonchon): Chong Yong-won
 Electoral District (Wolchon): Choe Kang
 Electoral District (Samsong): Chon Yong-son
 Electoral District (Inam): Ho Kwang-chun
 Electoral District (Kwaksan): Kye Myong-chol
 Electoral District (Wonha): Cha Sung-su
 Electoral District (Chojang): Kim Jae-song
 Electoral District (Unjon): Kim In-sun
 Electoral District (Taeo): Chon Kyong-son
 Electoral District (Posok): Choe Kwang-chol
 Electoral District (Pakchon): Kim Hak-chol
 Electoral District (Toksam): Ryu Jong-kuk
 Electoral District (Maengjung): Chon Kyong-nam
 Electoral District (Nyongbyon): Kim Kum-sil
 Electoral District (Phalwon): Kim Jong-bin
 Electoral District (Kujang): Kim Hi-thaek
 Electoral District (Ryongdung): Kim Yong-song
 Electoral District (Ryongmun): Ri Kyong-jin
 Electoral District (Suku): Chong Ri-jong
 Electoral District (Hyangsan): Chon Hyong-jong
 Electoral District (Thaephyong): Kim Kyong-hui
 Electoral District (Unsan): Kim Yong-chun
 Electoral District (Phungyang): Ri Chol-jin
 Electoral District (Choyang): Kim Chang-ryong
 Electoral District (Thaechon): O Hye-son
 Electoral District (Unhung): Ho Jong-ok
 Electoral District (Hakbong): Kim Man-su
 Electoral District (Chonma): Choe Jong-kon
 Electoral District (Choak): Kim Kun-chol
 Electoral District (Uiju): Chang Pyong-thae
 Electoral District (Unchon): Ryang Su-jong
 Electoral District (Tokryong): Mo Sung-kil
 Electoral District (Taekwan): Cho Yong-su
 Electoral District (Taeryong): Cha Myong-ok
 Electoral District (Changsong): Kim Yun-sok
 Electoral District (Tongchang): Han Chol-min
 Electoral District (Pyokdong): Cho Song-yun
 Electoral District (Sindo): Ri Yong-chol
 Electoral District (Yaksan): Choe Song-il
 Electoral District (Haechong): So Sung-chol
 Electoral District (Ubpha): Kim Hyon-suk
 Electoral District (Okkye): Choe Jong-ryong
 Electoral District (Soae): Kang Ji-yong
 Electoral District (Sokchon): Sim Il-chol
 Electoral District (Hakhyon): U Chang-sik
 Electoral District (Pyoksong): Pak Un-ok
 Electoral District (Chukchon): Ri Yong-chol
 Electoral District (Kangryong): Chang Yong-su
 Electoral District (Pupho): Yo Man-hyon
 Electoral District (Kumdong): Choe Sun-chol
 Electoral District (Ongjin): Sim Chol-ho
 Electoral District (Raengjong): Paek Kyong-sin
 Electoral District (Samsan): Kim Mok-ryong
 Electoral District (Chonsan): Kim Jong-man
 Electoral District (Thaethan): Chu Jong-kyong
 Electoral District (Kwasan): Ri Jong-kuk
 Electoral District (Changyon): Kim Il-jin
 Electoral District (Rakyon): Kang Thae-bong
 Electoral District (Samchon): Kim Ik-jung
 Electoral District (Talchon): Kim Jong
 Electoral District (Songhwa): Cha Yong-myong
 Electoral District (Unryul): Ri Song-ok
 Electoral District (Kumsanpho): Kang Kil-yong
 Electoral District (Changryon): Kim Sung-du
 Electoral District (Unchon): Kim Tok-song
 Electoral District (Ryangdam): Hong Kum-son
 Electoral District (Anak): Chi Sang-man
 Electoral District (Wolji): Choe Yong-sam
 Electoral District (Taechu): Hwang Yun-nam
 Electoral District (Omkos): Ri Chol-man
 Electoral District (Sinchon): Mun Ung-jo
 Electoral District (Saenal): Chae Yong-il
 Electoral District (Saekil): Pak Yong-ho
 Electoral District (Panjong): Ri Jong-bong
 Electoral District (Chaeryong): An Sung-ok
 Electoral District (Samjikang): Ri Hye-suk
 Electoral District (Changkuk): Ri Myong-kil
 Electoral District (Pukji): Kim Tae-song
 Electoral District (Sinwon): Kim Ok-kyu
 Electoral District (Muhak): Ri Su-yong
 Electoral District (Pongchon): Kang Yong-jun
 Electoral District (Sindab): Kang Jong-hui
 Electoral District (Paechon): Won Kyong-mo
 Electoral District (Kumsong): Chin Sang-chol
 Electoral District (Chongchon): Kim Jin-kuk
 Electoral District (Unbong): Kye Yong-sam
 Electoral District (Kumkok): Kang Myong-chol
 Electoral District (Yonan): Kang Phyo-yong
 Electoral District (Ohyon): Chin Yon-sil
 Electoral District (Songho): Ri Thae-sik
 Electoral District (Chonthae): Kong Yon-ok
 Electoral District (Haewol): Kim Hyong-ryong
 Electoral District (Chongdan): Ri Chang-ryong
 Electoral District (Namchon): Kwon Thae-mun
 Electoral District (Tokdal): Ri Hong-sob
 Electoral District (Hwayang): Ri Sung-ho
 Electoral District (Ryongyon): Choe Un
 Electoral District (Kumi): Hwang Kang-chol
 Electoral District (Kwail): Cho Jong-sob
 Electoral District (Sindae): Song Hyo-nam
 Electoral District (Sariwon): O Myong-chun
 Electoral District (Wonju): O Il-jong
 Electoral District (Mikok): Song Yun-hui
 Electoral District (Sonkyong): Kang Ha-kuk
 Electoral District (Kwangsong): Kang Ryon-hak
 Electoral District (Chongbang): Hwang Pyong-so
 Electoral District (Unha): Chae Kang-hwan
 Electoral District (Kuchon): Chang Myong-sil
 Electoral District (Songrim): Yun Je-won
 Electoral District (Sokthab): Kim Chung-kol
 Electoral District (Tangsan): Kwak Pom-ki
 Electoral District (Kaesong): Paek Chun-ki
 Electoral District (Tonghyon): Won Tong-yon
 Electoral District (Sonjuk): Ri Jong-hyok
 Electoral District (Unhak): Pang Kang-su
 Electoral District (Tokam): Chon Yong-nam
 Electoral District (Phyonghwa): Kim Song-hui
 Electoral District (Ryongsan): Ri Kil-song
 Electoral District (Kaephung): Kim Jong-kak
 Electoral District (Hwangju): Chon Sung-nam
 Electoral District (Chongryong): Ri Chol-ho
 Electoral District (Samjong): Kim Chol-kuk
 Electoral District (Hukkyo): Kim Yong-kon
 Electoral District (Yonthan): Ri Hun-yong
 Electoral District (Misan): Ri Yong-sik
 Electoral District (Pongsan): Pak Thae-dok
 Electoral District (Madong): Kim Song-chol
 Electoral District (Chongkye): Kim Chang-kwang
 Electoral District (Kuyon): Kim Ok-son
 Electoral District (Unpha): Pae Hak
 Electoral District (Kangan): Choe Chang-son
 Electoral District (Kwangmyong): Rim Sok-bok
 Electoral District (Rinsan): Choe Jin-su
 Electoral District (Taechon): Kim Jong-ok
 Electoral District (Sohung): Ri Thae-sob
 Electoral District (Poman): Ri Jae-uk
 Electoral District (Suan): Choe Sin-uk
 Electoral District (Namjong): Pak Yong-chol
 Electoral District (Yonsan): Kim Tu-chol
 Electoral District (Holdong): Ri Jong-mu
 Electoral District (Sinphyong): Ri Chol-kyu
 Electoral District (Mannyon): Ri Yong-jin
 Electoral District (Koksan): Cho Jun-hak
 Electoral District (Phyongam): Ryu Myong-kum
 Electoral District (Sinkye): Nam Yong-suk
 Electoral District (Chongbong): Cho Song-hwan
 Electoral District (Chuchon): Pak Ui-chun
 Electoral District (Phyongsan): Choe Kyong-nam
 Electoral District (Chongsu): Ho Yong-chun
 Electoral District (Kumchon): Kim Wan-su
 Electoral District (Hyonnae): Pak Hye-suk
 Electoral District (Thosan(Kim Jong-ok
 Electoral District (Yangsa): Chang Ki-ho
 Electoral District (Changphung): Cho Yong-chol
 Electoral District (Kuhwa): Pak Sun-kil
 Electoral District (Sangwon): Kim Yong-ho
 Electoral District (Myongdang): Yun Jae-hyok
 Electoral District (Chunghwa): Han Ung-su
 Electoral District (Chaesong): Kim Ki-nam
 Electoral District (Sungho): Im Hun
 Electoral District (Mathan): Ri Hwa-sil
 Electoral District (Wonmyong): Kim Ui-bong
 Electoral District (Kangkye): Choe Chang-son
 Electoral District (Yonju): An Yong-nam
 Electoral District (Puchang): Chon Kil-su
 Electoral District (Yahak): Ri Kwang
 Electoral District (Sokhyon): Han Yong-ho
 Electoral District (Oeryong): Kim Hye-ran
 Electoral District (Naeryong): Kim Kwang-ju
 Electoral District (Manpho): Kim Chun-sob
 Electoral District (Kuo): Hong Sung-mu
 Electoral District (Munak): Pyon Kyong-hwan
 Electoral District (Huichon): Cho Jae-yong
 Electoral District (Solmoru): So Kyong-ho
 Electoral District (Chuphyong): Ra Kyong-ryong
 Electoral District (Chongnyon): Chon Yong-ung
 Electoral District (Chonphyong): Ri Yong
 Electoral District (Songkan): Pak To-chun
 Electoral District (Songryong): Sin Kwan-jin
 Electoral District (Chonchon): Chong Chun-sil
 Electoral District (Hakmu): Chong Sung-ki
 Electoral District (Koin): Kim Kum-chol
 Electoral District (Ryongrim): Kim Ryong-sil
 Electoral District (Tongsin): Pak Yong-su
 Electoral District (Songwon): Ri Yong-ju
 Electoral District (Changkang): Kim Chang-myong
 Electoral District (Hyangha): Kim Chae-ran
 Electoral District (Rangrim): Ri Jong-suk
 Electoral District (Hwaphyong): Kim Kwang-chol
 Electoral District (Chasong): Chang Song-kuk
 Electoral District (Chungkang): Ryom In-yun
 Electoral District (Sijung): Pang Kwan-bok
 Electoral District (Wiwon): O Kum-chol
 Electoral District (Ryangkang): Pyon Won-chol
 Electoral District (Chosan): Pak Kum-hui
 Electoral District (Kophung): Pak Kyong-il
 Electoral District (Usi): Kim Tok-hun
 Electoral District (Sekil): An Yong-kuk
 Electoral District (Kwanphung): Pyon Ung-kyu
 Electoral District (Changdok): Yun Sang-bom
 Electoral District (Pongchun): Pak Jong-nam
 Electoral District (Myongsok): Ho Jong-man
 Electoral District (Wonnam): Rim Sun-hui
 Electoral District (Phohwa): Han Won-il
 Electoral District (Pokmak): Kim Kwang-il
 Electoral District (Kalma): Kim Yun-hyok
 Electoral District (Munchon): Ri Hak-chol
 Electoral District (Munphyong): Chi Jong-kwan
 Electoral District (Okphyong): Kim Jong-sim
 Electoral District (Chonnae): Kwon Kum-ryong
 Electoral District (Hwara): Kim Jin-kyu
 Electoral District (Anbyon): Han Pyong-man
 Electoral District (Paehwa): Kim Yong-sik
 Electoral District (Kosan): Ho Song-il
 Electoral District (Puphyong): Chong Hae
 Electoral District (Solbong): Son Kum-wol
 Electoral District (Thongchon): O Kang-chol
 Electoral District (Songjon): Yun Yong-il
 Electoral District (Kosong): Kim In-bok
 Electoral District (Onjong): Pak Myong-kuk
 Electoral District (Kumkang): Kang Su-rin
 Electoral District (Soksa): Kye Hun-nyo
 Electoral District (Changdo): Pak Kun-kwang
 Electoral District (Kimhwa): Kim Tong-son
 Electoral District (Songsan): Kim Chon-kyun
 Electoral District (Hoeyang): Mun Yong-chol
 Electoral District (Sepho): Hwang Min
 Electoral District (Huphyong): Won To-hui
 Electoral District (Phyongkang): Son Chol-ju
 Electoral District (Pokkye): Ri Jong-mun
 Electoral District (Cholwon): Pak Tu-phil
 Electoral District (Naemun): Kim Kuk-chang
 Electoral District (Ichon): Han Yong-chol
 Electoral District (Phankyo): Paek Jong-sun
 Electoral District (Pobdong): Han Chun-sik
 Electoral District (Somun): Kim Yong-jin
 Electoral District (Samil): Han Chang-nam
 Electoral District (Sangsinhung): Chu Yong-suk
 Electoral District (Tonghungsan): Mun Yong-son
 Electoral District (Sosang): Thae Jong-su
 Electoral District (Phungho): Mun Sang-kwon
 Electoral District (Hoesang): Yu Kyong-suk
 Electoral District (Sekori): Han Song-il
 Electoral District (Chongsong): Kwon Son-hwa
 Electoral District (Toksan): Ho Song-chol
 Electoral District (Sapho): Ri Chun-hwa
 Electoral District (Saekori): Chong Pyong-kon
 Electoral District (Choun): Kim Sung-ki
 Electoral District (Hungdok): Yu Kwang-jong
 Electoral District (Hungso): Mun Kwang-il
 Electoral District (Haean): Chong Chang-sok
 Electoral District (Unjung): Kim Il-hun
 Electoral District (Chonki): Kong Sung-il
 Electoral District (Ryujong): Choe Hyon
 Electoral District (Soho): Kim Chol-yong
 Electoral District (Sinpho): Song Chun-sob
 Electoral District (Phungo): Choe Myong-chol
 Electoral District (Ohang): Ri Hyok
 Electoral District (Yanghwa): Tong Yong-il
 Electoral District (Tanchon): Ri Chan-hwa
 Electoral District (Ssangryong): Chon Hye-song
 Electoral District (Sindanchon): Ho Thae-chol
 Electoral District (Omong): Kang Jong-kwan
 Electoral District (Ryongdae): Pak Yong-sik
 Electoral District (Kwangchon): Ri Chun-sam
 Electoral District (Paekkumsan): Chang Chun-kun
 Electoral District (Kumkol): Choe Chol
 Electoral District (Pukdu): Hwang Yong-sam
 Electoral District (Sudong): Ri Chang-han
 Electoral District (Ryongphyong): Kang Pyong-hu
 Electoral District (Changdong): Hwang Pong-chol
 Electoral District (Kowon): Kang Thae-sok
 Electoral District (Puraesan): Kim Hyon-jin
 Electoral District (Yodok): Han Ryong-kuk
 Electoral District (Kumya): Ri Kyu-man
 Electoral District (Inhung): Chang Sun-kum
 Electoral District (Kajin): Chon Yong-nam
 Electoral District (Kwangmyongsong): Chon Kwang-ho
 Electoral District (Chungnam): Sok Won-chun
 Electoral District (Chongphyong): Nam Yong-hwal
 Electoral District (Sondok): Pak Chun-nam
 Electoral District (Sinsang): Ri Tong-chun
 Electoral District (Chowon): Ri Hye-jong
 Electoral District (Toksan): Chang Ung
 Electoral District (Changjin): Kim Chol-kyu
 Electoral District (Yangji): Kwon Thae-yong
 Electoral District (Pujon): Choe Chol-hu
 Electoral District (Sinhung): Kim Sok-sun
 Electoral District (Sangwonchon): Kye Pong-chun
 Electoral District (Puhung): Han Ju-song
 Electoral District (Yongkwang): Ri Wan-ho
 Electoral District (Sujon): Pak Jong-hyon
 Electoral District (Kisang): Choe Kwi-hon
 Electoral District (Hamju): An Jong-su
 Electoral District (Kusang): Kim Song-bong
 Electoral District (Tongbong): Ri Yong-ae
 Electoral District (Sangjung): Kim Jong-sok
 Electoral District (Sojung): Kim Tong-chun
 Electoral District (Samho): Cha Kyong-il
 Electoral District (Hongwon): Choe Pok-sun
 Electoral District (Sanyang): Hong Chol-kun
 Electoral District (Unpho): Ryang Chang-nam
 Electoral District (Toksong): Kim Sang-ryong
 Electoral District (Changhung): Chong Kyong-hwa
 Electoral District (Pukchong): Kim Jin-kuk
 Electoral District (Sinchang): Chong Tok-yong
 Electoral District (Sinbukchong): Kang Jong-ho
 Electoral District (Chonghung): Ho Myong-ok
 Electoral District (Riwon): Ko Son-ok
 Electoral District (Rahung): Han Jang-bin
 Electoral District (Chaejong): Kim Kyong-jun
 Electoral District (Hochon): Sin Pyong-kang
 Electoral District (Sinhong): Chong Kwang-kuk
 Electoral District (Sangnong): Choe In-ho
 Electoral District (Kumho): Ri Je-son
 Electoral District (Ranam): O Se-kwan
 Electoral District (Rabuk): Choe Sok-hwan
 Electoral District (Namchongjin): Kim Ki-song
 Electoral District (Puyun): Ri Sang-kwan
 Electoral District (Songphyong): So Yong-hak
 Electoral District (Sabong): Kim Kwang-nam
 Electoral District (Kangdok): Tong Hun
 Electoral District (Susong): Kim Hyong-chan
 Electoral District (Sunam): Paek Kum-sil
 Electoral District (Malum): Rim Mun-chol
 Electoral District (Phohang): Chong Song-hyok
 Electoral District (Subuk): O Kyong-sok
 Electoral District (Namhyang): Kim Yong-jae
 Electoral District (Sinjin): Kang Chol-ku
 Electoral District (Kyodong): O Su-yong
 Electoral District (Chongam): Kim Chol-ho
 Electoral District (Ryonjin): Song Ryong-su
 Electoral District (Kwanhae): Sin Chol-ung
 Electoral District (Hoeryong): Chong Son-hui
 Electoral District (Osandok): Ri Sun-sil
 Electoral District (Mangyang): Ri Kwi-ok
 Electoral District (Yuson): Ri Ryong-kuk
 Electoral District (Songam): Chon Song-man
 Electoral District (Chonghak): Ho Thae-ryul
 Electoral District (Chekang): Ri Song-jae
 Electoral District (Changphyong): Ho Jae-ryul
 Electoral District (Haksong): Kim Kum-ok
 Electoral District (Kilju): Kang Yong-thae
 Electoral District (Ilsin): Kim Il
 Electoral District (Chunam): Kim Song-ho
 Electoral District (Yongbuk): Kim Su-il
 Electoral District (Hwadae): Cho Kum-hui
 Electoral District (Ryongpho): Yu Chol-u
 Electoral District (Myongchon): Nam Sung-u
 Electoral District (Ryongam): Kim Thaek-ku
 Electoral District (Myongkan): An Tong-chun
 Electoral District (Ryongban): Ri Pom-kyong
 Electoral District (Kukdong): Choe Yong-suk
 Electoral District (Orang): Choe Yong-suk
 Electoral District (Odaejin): Chon Kwang-rok
 Electoral District (Kyongsong): Chong Yong-su
 Electoral District (Hamyon): Hong Pong-chol
 Electoral District (Sungam): Nam Hong-son
 Electoral District (Puryong): Ryang Yong-ho
 Electoral District (Musan): Myong Song-chol
 Electoral District (Soedol): Phyo Il-sok
 Electoral District (Sangchang): Kim Yong-kwang
 Electoral District (Yonsa): Ro Song-ung
 Electoral District (Onsong): Ri Thae-jin
 Electoral District (Wangjaesan): Kim Song-jong
 Electoral District (Chongsong): Kim Yong-kol
 Electoral District (Kyongwon): Sok Kil-ho
 Electoral District (Kokonwon): Kim Myong-son
 Electoral District (Ryongbuk): Chi Jae-ryong
 Electoral District (Kyonghung): Hong Man-ho
 Electoral District (Haksong): O Yong-nam
 Electoral District (Obong): Cha Song-nam
 Electoral District (Hyesan): Pak Chol-ho
 Electoral District (Hyejang): Chong Hyong-suk
 Electoral District (Thabsong): Chang In-suk
 Electoral District (Songbong): Ri Sang-won
 Electoral District (Ryonbong): Kim Mi-nam
 Electoral District (Sinpha): Kim Sung-hui
 Electoral District (Phophyong): Han Myong-song
 Electoral District (Koub): Yun Man-kol
 Electoral District (Phungsan): Kim Yu-suk
 Electoral District (Pochon): Pang Kwang-nam
 Electoral District (Samjiyon): Chu Thae-kyong
 Electoral District (Taehongdan): Kim Kwang-ho
 Electoral District (Paekam): An Mun-hak
 Electoral District (Yuphyong): Song Jong-su
 Electoral District (Unhung): Ri Song-kuk
 Electoral District (Saengjang): Choe Ki-jun
 Electoral District (Kabsan): Yon Thae-jong
 Electoral District (Oil): An Yong-ki
 Electoral District (Phungso): Ri Kyong-hwa
 Electoral District (Samsu): Han Myong-kuk
 Electoral District (Hangku): Kang Yang-mo
 Electoral District (Hupho): Han Kwang-bok
 Electoral District (Munae): Ro Ik
 Electoral District (Konkuk): Ri Jae-il
 Electoral District (Ryusa): Ha Ung-chon
 Electoral District (Waudo): Ri Kil-chun
 Electoral District (Namsan): Kim Tuk-sam
 Electoral District (Taedae): Kang Nung-su
 Electoral District (Kapmun): Tokko Chang-kuk
 Electoral District (Kangso): Kim Yong-song
 Electoral District (Sohak): Chong Myong-jo
 Electoral District (Chongsan): Yun Chun-hwa
 Electoral District (Soki): Ri Kwang-chol
 Electoral District (Tokhung): Ryu Mi-yong
 Electoral District (Chonrima): Chin Yong-il
 Electoral District (Kangson): Kim Hyong-nam
 Electoral District (Pobong): Chon Sung-hun
 Electoral District (Hwasok): Kim Kyong-ok
 Electoral District (Taean): Yang Sung-ho
 Electoral District (Oksu): Yun Hyang-sil
 Electoral District (Ryongkang): Im Jong-sil
 Electoral District (Okdo): Hwang Sun-hui
 Electoral District (Onchon): Kim Chol-man
 Electoral District (Haeun): Cho Yong-su
 Electoral District (Sohwa): Ri Song-il
 Electoral District (Kwisong): Hwang Yong-bo
 Electoral District (Rajin): Rim Kyong-man
 Electoral District (Tongmyong): Cho Jong-ho
 Electoral District (Changphyong): Sin Pong-yong
 Electoral District (Sonbong): Sin Tong-su
 Electoral District (Ungsang): Choe Song-nam

First session
In the first session of the 14th convocation, Ri Yong-mu and O Kuk-ryol retained their positions as vice-chairmen of the National Defense Commission, but Kim Yong-chun lost his vice-chairman position to Choe Ryong-hae. Minister of the People's Armed Forces Jang Jong-nam, as well as Jo Chun-ryong, were newly elected to the NDC, while Choe Pu-il, Kim Won-hong and Pak To-chun retained their membership. In the Cabinet of North Korea, the body which managed the administrative-economic apparatus, Premier of North Korea Pak Pong-ju was once again reelected to the position, which he held from 2003 to 2007, and again from 2013 to 2019. The positions in the cabinet remained primarily unchanged, and the premier, who managed the cabinet, had remained the same. Additionally, Kim Jong-un's younger sister, Kim Yo-jung, had been named in public for the first time, likely showing a rise in her own political power. She was identified as state comrade and senior official. She was shown with Kim Jong-un as he was making his way to vote at Kim Il-sung University. The most significant change in the cabinet was the replacement of Pak Ui-chun as Foreign Minister by Ri Su-yong.

Other appointments in the Cabinet:
Mun Myong-hak replaced Ri Yong-yong as Minister of Coal Industry
Kim Yong-gwang replaced Han Hyo-yon as Minister of Metallurgical Industry
Ri Hak-chol replaced Kang Min-chol as Minister of Mining Industry
Han Ryong-guk replaced Kim Kwang-yong as Minister of Forestry
Kim Kyong-nam replaced Ri Song-ho as Minister of Commerce
Pak Chun-nam replaced Hong Kwang-sun as Minister of Culture
Kim Chon-gyun replaced Paek Ryong-chon as President of the Central Bank of North Korea
Pak Myong-chol replaced Kim Pyong-ryul as President of the Supreme Court (not a cabinet position)

Notes

References

Elections in North Korea
North Korea
Parliamentary election
Supreme People's Assembly
Single-candidate elections
Election and referendum articles with incomplete results